Independent bookstores are small bookselling businesses, usually with one or a small number of locations in a limited geographic area. They contrast with corporate or chain bookstores, operated by a larger company, often with many stores across a large area.

Australia

Foreign Language Bookshop, Melbourne

Canada

Aqua Books in Winnipeg, Manitoba (defunct)
Attic Books in London, Ontario
Bakka-Phoenix in Toronto, Ontario
Bison Books in Winnipeg, Manitoba
Book City in Toronto, Ontario
The Book Room in Halifax, Nova Scotia was, at the time of its 2008 closing, the oldest bookstore in Canada (defunct)
Camas Bookstore and Infoshop in Victoria, British Columbia
Glad Day Bookshop in Toronto, Ontario
Highway Book Shop near Cobalt, Ontario (defunct)
Hyman's Book and Art Shoppe, independent Jewish bookstore in Toronto, Ontario (defunct)
Little Sister's Book and Art Emporium in Vancouver, British Columbia
McNally Robinson, small independently run chain of stores across Canada
Mondragon Bookstore & Coffeehouse in Winnipeg, Manitoba (defunct)
The Monkey's Paw in Toronto, Ontario
Munro's Books in Victoria, British Columbia
Spartacus Books in Vancouver, British Columbia
This Ain't the Rosedale Library in Toronto, Ontario (defunct)
Toronto Women's Bookstore in Toronto, Ontario (defunct)
The Word Bookstore in Montreal

France

José Corti in Paris
Shakespeare and Company in Paris

Germany

BuchGourmet in Cologne

Greenland

Atuagkat Bookstore in Nuuk

Israel
Sefer ve Sefel, Jerusalem

Jordan

Al-Jahith's Treasury

Norway
 Bokshop.no in Oslo

Philippines
 Solidaridad book shop in the Ermita district of Manila

Singapore

BooksActually in Tiong Bahru

South Africa
 Fascination Books

Taiwan
See

United Kingdom

An Ceathrú Póilí in Belfast
Arthur Probsthain in London
Barter Books in Alnwick Station, Northumberland
Blackwell's in Oxford
Compendium Books in London
Daunt Books in London
Housmans in London
The Second Shelf in London
Stanfords in London

United States

See also

 List of bookstore chains
List of feminist bookstores

References

 List
Independent
.